Marino Mikaele-Tu'u (born 6 November 1997) is a New Zealand rugby union player who plays as a loose forward for the  in Super Rugby and  in New Zealand's domestic National Provincial Championship competition.

Early career

Mikaele-Tu'u was born in Wellington and moved to Hawke's Bay at the age of 11. He has a twin brother, Antonio, and a younger sister, Liana, who also play first class rugby.

Mikaele-Tu'u attended Hastings Boys' High School and was one of the standout players for their First XV team in 2014 and 2015. Mikaele-Tu'u played age-grade rugby for Hawke's Bay and also played for the  U18 team in 2015.

Senior career

In 2016, Mikaele-Tu'u was - for the first time - named in the  Mitre 10 Cup squad. He made his Magpies debut, off the bench, on 20 August 2016 against . While he played only two games in his first season, he has since established himself as a regular starter for the Magpies.

Although Mikaele-Tu'u wasn't named in the ' squad for the 2018 Super Rugby season, he was soon called up as an injury replacement for James Lentjes.

Two months later, the Highlanders announced they had signed Mikaele-Tu'u for 2019 and 2020. He didn't get much game time in 2019 - he played only two games - but had a break-out season in 2020. He cemented himself in the Highlanders' starting line-up and was one of the form New Zealand loose-forwards in Super Rugby, that year.

Mikaele-Tu'u was again named in the Highlanders' squad for the 2021 Super Rugby season.

International career

In 2014, Mikaele-Tu'u was named in New Zealand Barbarians Schools' team that played matches against Australian Schools and Fiji Schools. The following year, he was named in the New Zealand Secondary Schools team for a three-match international series in Australia. He played in all three games.

Mikaele-Tu'u was named in the New Zealand Under-20 squad for the 2016 Oceania Rugby Under 20 Championship and played in both matches of that year's series against . He was also part of the squad for the 2016 World Rugby Under 20 Championship in England. He played in all 5 games in a campaign that saw New Zealand finish at a disappointing 5th place.

In 2017, Mikaele-Tu'u enjoyed more success with the New Zealand Under 20 team. He played in two of the three games, and New Zealand retained the Oceania title.

On 8 May 2017, Mikaele-Tu'u was named in the New Zealand Under-20 squad for the 2017 World Rugby Under 20 Championship in Georgia. He played in all New Zealand's games, including the record 64-17 win over England in the final. New Zealand claimed its 6th World Rugby U20 Championship title that year.

On 5 December 2020, Mikaele-Tu'u - who is of Samoan descent - played for the Moana Pasifika team in a one-off match against the Māori All Blacks in Hamilton.

Mikaele-Tu'u was, on 10 October 2022, named in the All Blacks XV squad for two matches against Ireland A and the Barbarians during their Northern Tour. He made his debut for the side on 4 November 2022 against Ireland A. The All Blacks XV won the game 47–19.

References

External links
 

1997 births
Living people
New Zealand sportspeople of Samoan descent
People educated at Hastings Boys' High School
New Zealand rugby union players
Rugby union flankers
Highlanders (rugby union) players
Hawke's Bay rugby union players
Moana Pasifika players
Rugby union players from Wellington City